John Haden Badley (21 February 1865 – 6 March 1967) was an English author, educator, and founder of Bedales School, which claims to have become the first coeducational public boarding school in England in 1893.

Life
Born in Dudley, Worcestershire, (now West Midlands), England, son of Dr. James Payton Badley and Laura Elizabeth Best his wife. He was the grandson of John Badley, one of the original 300 fellows of the Royal College of Surgeons. Early in life he saw the poverty and squalor of many working class in the Midlands. When fifteen he entered the Upper School at Rugby.

These early experiences were very influential in shaping his ideas of what education should not be. While a student at Trinity College Cambridge he gained the appreciation of a standard of music and theatre and he described King's Chapel as providing "a standard of loveliness of trained voices in that architectural setting of something near perfection." His autobiography describes a tea with Oscar Wilde at which they discussed the English Poets. Here too his friendship with Edmund Garrett encouraged him to join the small minority of men who supported the women's movement for socio-political equality. In 1892 he married Garrett's sister Amy who would be a strong partner until her death in 1956, and the drive behind one of Bedales's most important innovations - successful co-education. A school, he felt, should be organized like a family, with willing cooperation for common ends as the main motive rather than on the basis of mere competition. He felt that the training for social usefulness held equal importance with the fullest possible development of the individual.

At Cambridge Badley became a lifelong socialist, influenced by the ideals of William Morris about art and community life. But the decisive influence on the direction these ideas should take was Cecil Reddie founder of Abbotsholme School and arguably the originator of the 'modern' British progressive school. Graduating from Cambridge with a first class classics degree in 1887, Badley heard about the plans for Reddie's school through his university friend Goldsworthy Lowes Dickinson when he came down in 1888, went there and was instantly fascinated. He was, at the age of twenty-four, one of the first masters appointed, but it is probable that from the start he had secret plans to found a school of his own.  After two and a half years Reddie's increasingly autocratic temperament - and the fact that Badley wanted to marry and Reddie said he could not - gave him the impetus to leave and start his own school.  He married Amy Garrett, sister of his Cambridge friend Fydell Edmund Garrett, in 1892, and in January 1893, with the help of Oswald Powell they opened their school, Bedales, in a rented property near Haywards Heath.

Startup
All Badley's initial ideas ― though their later development was quite different ― were taken from Reddie. For instance the curriculum was English based, not classical, and wide ― with science, art, music, French, German, and opportunities for plays and hobbies. Religion was non-dogmatic and non-sectarian. Boys were not crammed for exams, there were no prizes and lessons were only in the mornings. The games madness of Rugby and the conventional Public School was condemned; instead much time was spent on manual labour in fields and gardens, and the boys were also taught tailoring, boot making and cookery. Badley also copied many of the early organisational details too, right down to the earth closets which enabled him to return to the soil that which had been taken from it. He experimented with different ideas during the 1920s including the Dalton Plan approach to assignments.

He claimed, in his own modesty, to owe much to Montessori, Pestalozzi, Fröbel and Dewey. Helen Parkhurst of the "Dalton Plan" would draw on his experience years later in New York City. In 1898, five years after Bedales was founded, at the insistence of his wife Amy, an ardent suffragette (she was a cousin of Elizabeth Garrett Anderson and Millicent Fawcett), he took the further risk of engaging in a 'preposterous experiment' which led to Bedales becoming a fully coeducational boarding school. In May 1899 this pioneering headmaster started building a new complex which still serves the school today at Steep, Petersfield, Hampshire.

Operation
Badley was a great educationalist, an able Classicist; tall handsome charismatic, leading through example and great personal authority. Integral to that persona though was the personal reserve and sexual repression characteristic of the English Public School system, coupled with the quaint and even cranky - to modern sensibilities at least - obsessions of 1890 Sandal Socialism and German Naturkultur: the emphasis on cold baths, earth closets, homespun fabrics, and "unsilly" (i.e. non-sexual) friendship between adolescent boys and girls.  He was strict and he was obeyed; he neither smoked nor drank: "When he came stalking with his quick, silent tread, into the classroom there was immediate silence; if there happened to be a piece of paper on the floor, he would point to it without deigning to say a word, and the boy nearest would hurriedly pick it up."

He created a marvellous example of the evolving school. His educational outline, which he knew would fill out and develop as the years passed, became a framework to which he would continue to contribute and set outer limits, but then allowed the school to evolve. While he would be called "Chief" for the rest of his life by students and staff alike, he did not dominate as most great headmasters have. At the age of seventy he retired to Cholesbury, near Tring, after being headmaster of his school for forty-two years. Cholesbury is some 2½ miles from Spencers Green where the Badleys' son (John Edmund Badley, known as Jock, b 3.10.94) and daughter in law had their farm.

Death and legacy
He wrote a number of books in his lifetime which include After the War (1917), Bedales: A Pioneer School (1923), Form and Spirit (1951), and his autobiography, Memories and Reflections, published in 1955, written ten years earlier and given to a friend and colleague for posthumous publication. After the friend died he consented to have it released. Yet it was his last work that can be looked at as his magnum opus: A Bible for Modern Readers (the New Testament) in 1961 and The Bible As Seen Today (the Old Testament) in 1965 together comprise over 1000 pages.

After his wife's death he returned to live his last years in the School grounds where he died.

A favourite quotation was "Labour, Art, Worship, Love, these make men's lives."

Bibliography
Bedales School; A School for Boys. Outline of its aims and system (1892), Cambridge University Press 
Bedales School: Outline of Its Aims and System: An Essay in Education (1912), Cambridge University Press
Co-education in Practice (1914), Cambridge: Heffer
Education after the War (1917), Oxford: Blackwell
School Talks in Peace and War (1920), Oxford: Blackwell.
Co-education and Its Part in a Complete Education (1920), Cambridge: Heffer
Notes and suggestions for Those who Join the staff at Bedales School 1922 Cambridge University Press
Bedales: A Pioneer School (1923), London: Methuen
The Will to Live: An Outline of Evolutionary Psychology (1931), London: Allen & Unwin
The Will to Fuller Life (1933), London: Allen & Unwin
"These Make Men's Lives" (1935), Oxford: Blackwell
A Schoolmaster's Testament: Forty Years of Educational Experience (1937), Oxford: Blackwell
Form and Spirit: A Study in Religion (1951), London: Routledge & Kegan Paul
Memories and Reflections (1955), London: Allen & Unwin
The Bible as Seen To-day (1965), Reading: Berkshire: Printing Co. (three-volume edition of titles below)
A Bible for Modern Readers (and What It Means for Us): The New Testament (1961), London: James Clarke
The Bible as Seen To-day: The Old Testament (1965), Reading: Berkshire Printing Co. (2 vols.)

Notes

External links

1865 births
1967 deaths
19th-century English educators
20th-century English educators
19th-century English writers
20th-century English memoirists
Alumni of Trinity College, Cambridge
English centenarians
English educational theorists
English non-fiction writers
Men centenarians
Schoolteachers from the West Midlands
Founders of English schools and colleges
People from Dudley
English male non-fiction writers
English socialists